The discography of American rock band Phantom Planet consists of five studio albums, three extended plays (EPs), one remix album, eleven singles, six music videos, and two live DVD.
Phantom Planet is an alternative rock band from Southern California. The band consists of vocalist-rhythm guitarist Alex Greenwald, lead guitarist Darren Robinson, bassist Sam Farrar and drummer Jeff Conrad. The band is best known for its track "California", which became the theme song for the Fox TV series, The O.C.. 
On November 25, 2008, the band announced in a blog entry on their website that they are going on "hiatus, and will not be playing any more live shows or making any new records, indefinitely."
They played their last show on December 12, 2008, in Los Angeles. Alex mentioned numerous times during their last show that the band was, in fact, going on a hiatus, not breaking up.

Albums

Studio albums

Live albums

Compilation albums

Remix albums

Extended plays

Singles

As lead artist

As featured artist

Other appearances 
 "The Living Dead" was originally recorded for the soundtrack released in support of video game Stubbs the Zombie in 2005. It was later released as a Japanese bonus track for ''Phantom Planet.

Music videos

DVDs

References 

Rock music group discographies
Discographies of American artists